Microphaea is a genus of moths of the family Noctuidae. The genus was erected by George Hampson in 1910.

Species
Microphaea acidaliata Dognin, 1914 Ecuador
Microphaea griseata Hampson, 1910 Brazil (Espito Santo)
Microphaea nyctichroa Hampson, 1910 Panama
Microphaea orientalis Hampson, 1918 Borneo

References

Acontiinae